Shalford railway station serves the village of Shalford, Surrey, England. The station, and all trains serving it, are operated by Great Western Railway. It is on the North Downs Line. To the west is Shalford Junction,  from Charing Cross, where the North Downs Line meets the Portsmouth Direct Line  from Waterloo (via ).

History
In 1940, Shalford was a sub-control centre coordinating the evacuation trains dispersing the soldiers brought back from Dunkirk.

On 11 April 1944 two goods trains collided at Shalford Station.  One of them consisted of  tankers of aviation fuel en route to airfields in Kent.  Leaks from the damaged wagons caused a major fire which was eventually brought under control by the fire brigade, with assistance of members of the local police and Home Guard volunteers, who used sandbags to contain the spread  of the burning fuel. Nearby properties, including a potato and vegetable store, were badly damaged as was the steel road bridge over the railway that was buckled by the heat. Fortunately the local pub, the Queen Victoria, escaped unharmed.

Services
Additional services from Reading terminate at Shalford in peak hours.

Between Guildford and Redhill the stopping service pattern alternates every two hours off-peak:

In peak hours the stopping service serves all stations in both directions.

References

External links

Railway stations in Surrey
Former South Eastern Railway (UK) stations
Railway stations in Great Britain opened in 1849
Railway stations served by Great Western Railway
1849 establishments in England